is a Japanese kickboxer and Muay Thai fighter, currently competing in the bantamweight division of K-1.

Martial arts career

KNOCK OUT
Ishii faced the one-time Lumpinee Stadium flyweight title challenger Kazuki Osaki for the inaugural KNOCK OUT Flyweight championship at KING OF KNOCK OUT 2018 on December 9, 2018. He won the fight by majority decision, with all three judges scoring the bout 49–48 in his favor.

Ishii faced Yoddoy Kaewsamrit for the WPMF World Flyweight championship in his next fight, at KODO 4 on February 24, 2019. He won the fight by a third-round technical knockout. 

After capturing the KNOCK OUT and WPMF titles, Ishii fought Petchthailand Moopingaroijung for the vacant IBF Muay Thai World Flyweight title at the June 12, 2019 Suk Wan Kingthong event. He won the fight by a third-round knockout, stopping Petchthailand with a spinning backfist at the very end of the round. Petchthailand and Ishii fought an immediate rematch at the  August 9, 2019 True4U event, with the WBC Muay Thai World Super Flyweight title on the line. Ishii lost the fight by decision, with scores of 48–49, 47–49 and 47–50.

Ishii faced Nuapetch KelaSport in a non-title bout at the November 13, 2019 Suk Wan Kingthong event. He won the fight by third-round technical knockout.

Battle of Muaythai
Ishii was booked to face Hiroyuki for the Battle of Muay Thai Super Flyweight title at BOM WAVE 01 ~ Get Over The COVID-19 on June 28, 2020. He won the fight by unanimous decision, with two judges scoring the bout 49–47 in his favor, while the third judge scored the bout 50–47 in his favor.

Ishii faced Yuya Iwanami in a non-title bout at NO KICK NO LIFE ~Shin Shou~ Diamond FES	on October 29, 2020. He won his promotional debut by a second-round technical knockout, after he forced Iwanami's corner to throw in the towel.

Ishii made his first BoM Super Flyweight title defense against Satoshi Katashima at BOM WAVE 01 ~ Get Over The COVID-19	on December 6, 2020. Aside from Ishii's title, the WPMF World Super Flyweight title was on the line as well. Ishii won the fight by unanimous decision, with scores of 50–46, 49–48 and 49–47.

Ishii faced Reiya in a non-title bout at NO KICK NO LIFE ~Shin Shou~ Ungaisouten on February 24, 2021. He won the fight by unanimous decision, with all three judges awarding him a 30–28 scorecard. Ishii faced Sanchai TeppenGym in another non-title bout at BOM WAVE 04 – Get Over The COVID-19 on April 11, 2021. He won the fight by a fourth-round knockout.

Ishii was booked to face Kazuki Osaki at RISE WORLD SERIES 2021 on July 18, 2021, in the semifinals of the 2021 RISE Dead or Alive super flyweight tournament. The winner of the tournament was expected to face Tenshin Nasukawa in his final bout with the promotion. Ishii lost his RISE debut by unanimous decision, with scores of 29-28, 29-28 and 29-27.

Ishii returned to Battle of Muaythai for his next fight, a non-title bout against Kojima Nor.Naksin at BOM WAVE 06 – Get Over The COVID-19 on November 7, 2021. He won the fight by unanimous decision, with all three judges scoring it 49–48 for Ishii.

On January 9, 2021 Ishii faced Ryu Hanaoka at the NO KICK NO LIFE event. He lost by unanimous decision after five rounds.

Ishii faced Khun Namisan Shobukai at BOM WAVE 08 – Get Over The COVID-19 on April 24, 2022, in his final fight with the promotion before signing with K-1. He won the fight by a second-round knockout.

K-1
On June 14, 2022, it was revealed that Ishii had signed with K-1. He was booked to make his promotional debut against Kazuki Fujita at K-1 World GP 2022 in Fukuoka on August 11, 2022. Ishii won the fight by a third-round knockout, flooring Fujita with a right straight at the 2:41 minute mark of the round.

Ishii faced Detchphet Wor.Sangprapai for the vacant WBC MuayThai World Super Flyweight title at The Battle of Muay Thai "OUROBOROS" on September 23, 2022. He won the fight by knockout in the first round with a series of left hooks.

Ishii faced the undefeated WKA World -54 kg champion Oscar Bohorquez in the quarterfinals of the 2022 K-1 Bantamweight World Grand Prix. The one-day tournament, held to crown the inaugural K-1 bantamweight champion, was held at K-1 World GP 2022 in Osaka on December 3, 2022. He forced a referee stoppage with a flurry of punches with 13 seconds left in the second round and advanced to the semifinals, where he faced the reigning Krush Bantamweight champion Koji Ikeda. Ishii won the fight by unanimous decision, with scores of 30–29, 30–29 and 30–28. He advanced to the finals, where he faced the 2021 K-1 Japan Grand Prix winner Toma Kuroda. He lost the fight by split decision, after an extra fourth round was contested.

Ishii faced Yodsila Chor.Hapayak at K-1 World GP 2023: K'Festa 6 on March 12, 2023. He lost the fight by unanimous decision, with scores of 29–28, 29–28 and 29–27.

Championships and accomplishments

Amateur
 2010 WINDY Super Fight -30kg Champion
 2010 M-1 -35kg Champion
 2010 King of Strikers -35kg Champion
 2011 Windy Super Fight -35kg Champion
 2011 TRIBELATE -35kg Champion
 2011 M-1 Junior -35kg Champion
 2011 King of Strikers -40kg Champion
 2012 Windy Kick Jr 40kg Champion
 2013 GLADIATOR Kick Jr 45kg
 2013 Trang Province 45kg Champion

Professional
Punpanmuang
 2014 Punpanmuang Mini Flyweight Champion

True4U Muaymanwansuk
 2017 True4U Flyweight Champion

KNOCK OUT
 2018 KING OF KNOCK OUT Flyweight Champion

International Boxing Federation Muaythai
 2019 IBF Muay Thai World Flyweight Champion

World Professional Muaythai Federation
 2019 WPMF World Flyweight Champion
 2020 WPMF World Super Flyweight Champion

The Battle of Muay Thai
 2020 Battle of Muay Thai Super Flyweight Champion (1 defense)

World Boxing Council MuayThai
 2022 WBC MuayThai World Super Flyweight Champion

K-1
 2022 K-1 Bantamweight World Grand Prix Runner-up

Fight record

|- style="background:#c5d2ea;"
| 2023-03-12 || Draw ||align=left| Yodsila Chor.Hapayak || K-1 World GP 2023: K'Festa 6 || Tokyo, Japan || Tech. Draw || 3 ||3:00 
|-  style="background:#fbb"
| 2022-12-03|| Loss ||align=left| Toma Kuroda ||  K-1 World GP 2022 in Osaka Bantamweight World Grand Prix, Final || Osaka, Japan || Ext.R Decision (Split) || 4 || 3:00
|-
! style=background:white colspan=9 |
|-  style="background:#cfc"
| 2022-12-03|| Win ||align=left| Koji Ikeda ||  K-1 World GP 2022 in Osaka Bantamweight World Grand Prix, Semi Final || Osaka, Japan || Decision (Unanimous) || 3 || 3:00
|-  style="background:#cfc"
| 2022-12-03|| Win ||align=left| Oscar Bohorquez ||  K-1 World GP 2022 in Osaka Bantamweight World Grand Prix, Quarter Final || Osaka, Japan || TKO (Referee stoppage)|| 2 ||2:47
|-  style="background:#cfc;"
| 2022-09-23|| Win || align=left| Detchphet Wor.Sangprapai ||  The Battle of Muay Thai "OUROBOROS" || Tokyo, Japan || KO (Left hook to the body)|| 1 || 1:03
|-
! style=background:white colspan=9 |
|-  style="background:#cfc;"
| 2022-08-11|| Win ||align=left| Kazuki Fujita ||  K-1 World GP 2022 in Fukuoka || Fukuoka, Japan || KO (Right straight) || 3 || 2:41
|-
|-  style="background:#cfc;"
| 2022-06-26||Win || align=left| Khunsuk Sor.Dechaphan || Suk Wan Kingthong "to challenge"|| Tokyo, Japan || Decision (Unanimous) || 5 ||3:00 
|-  style="background:#cfc;"
| 2022-04-24|| Win || align=left| Khun Namisan Shobukai ||  BOM WAVE 08 – Get Over The COVID-19 || Beppu, Japan || KO (Left hook) || 2 || 0:54
|-  style="text-align:center; background:#fbb;"
| 2022-01-09|| Loss || align=left| Ryu Hanaoka ||  NO KICK NO LIFE || Tokyo, Japan || Decision (Unanimous) || 5||3:00
|-  style="text-align:center; background:#cfc;"
| 2021-11-07|| Win ||align=left| Kojima Nor.Naksin || BOM WAVE 06 – Get Over The COVID-19  || Yokohama, Japan || Decision || 5 || 3:00
|-  style="text-align:center; background:#fbb;"
| 2021-07-18|| Loss ||align=left| Kazuki Osaki || RISE WORLD SERIES 2021 - Dead or Alive Tournament, Quarter Final || Osaka, Japan || Decision (Unanimous) || 3 || 3:00
|-  style="text-align:center; background:#cfc;"
| 2021-04-11|| Win ||align=left| Sanchai TeppenGym|| BOM WAVE 04 – Get Over The COVID-19  || Yokohama, Japan || KO (Kick to the body)  || 4 || 2:30
|-  style="text-align:center; background:#cfc;"
| 2021-02-24 || Win ||align=left| Reiya || NO KICK NO LIFE ~Shin Shou~ Ungaisouten || Tokyo, Japan ||  Decision (Unanimous) || 5||3:00
|-  style="text-align:center; background:#cfc;"
| 2020-12-06 || Win ||align=left| Satoshi Katashima|| BOM WAVE 01 ~ Get Over The COVID-19 || Tokyo, Japan || Decision (Unanimous)  ||5 ||3:00 
|-
! style=background:white colspan=9 |
|-  style="text-align:center; background:#cfc;"
| 2020-10-29 || Win ||align=left| Yuya Iwanami || NO KICK NO LIFE ~Shin Shou~ || Tokyo, Japan ||  TKO (Corner stoppage/Elbow) || 2||2:09
|-  style="text-align:center; background:#cfc;"
| 2020-06-28 || Win ||align=left| Hiroyuki || BOM WAVE 01 ~ Get Over The COVID-19 || Tokyo, Japan || Decision (Unanimous)  ||5 ||3:00 
|-
! style=background:white colspan=9 |
|-  style="text-align:center; background:#cfc"
| 2019-11-13 || Win ||align=left| Nuapetch KelaSport || Suk Wan Kingthong || Tokyo, Japan || TKO (Right cross) || 3 || 1:48
|-  style="text-align:center; background:#FFBBBB"
| 2019-08-09 || Loss ||align=left| Petchthailand Moopingaroijung || True4u Lumpinee Stadium || Bangkok, Thailand || Decision (Unanimous) || 5 || 3:00
|-
! style=background:white colspan=9 |
|-  style="text-align:center; background:#cfc"
| 2019-06-12 || Win ||align=left| Petchthailand Moopingaroijung || Suk Wan Kingthong || Tokyo, Japan || KO (Spinning back kick)|| 3 || 3:06
|-
! style=background:white colspan=9 |
|-  style="text-align:center; background:#cfc"
| 2019-02-24 || Win ||align=left| Yoddoy Kaewsamrit || KODO 4 || Oita, Japan || TKO (Low kicks + Punches)|| 3 || 
|-
! style=background:white colspan=9 |
|-  style="text-align:center; background:#cfc;"
| 2018-12-09 || Win ||align=left| Kazuki Osaki || KING OF KNOCK OUT 2018 || Tokyo, Japan || Decision (Majority) || 5 || 3:00
|-
! style=background:white colspan=9 |
|-  style="text-align:center; background:#cfc;"
| 2018-10-07 || Win ||align=left| Taiga Nakayama || KNOCK OUT 2018 cross over || Tokyo, Japan || TKO (Doctor stoppage) || 3 || 2:04
|-  style="text-align:center; background:#cfc;"
| 2018-08-19 || Win ||align=left| Jin Mandokoro || KNOCK OUT SUMMER FES.2018 || Tokyo, Japan || Decision (Unanimous) || 5 || 3:00
|-  style="text-align:center; background:#cfc;"
| 2018-05-06 || Win ||align=left| Daishin Sakai || Rizin 10 || Tokyo, Japan || Decision (Unanimous) || 3 || 3:00
|-  style="text-align:center; background:#cfc;"
| 2018-02-12 || Win ||align=left| Nong Rose Banjaroensuk || KNOCK OUT First Impact || Tokyo, Japan || KO (Punch to the body) || 2 ||
|-  style="text-align:center; background:#cfc;"
| 2017-12-10 || Win ||align=left| Tatsuya Noto || KING OF KNOCK OUT 2017 || Tokyo, Japan || Decision (Unanimous) || 5 || 3:00
|-  style="text-align:center; background:#FFBBBB;"
| 2017-10-15 || Loss ||align=left| Jin Mandokoro || Rizin World Grand Prix 2017: Opening Round - Part 2 || Fukuoka, Japan || Decision (Majority) || 3 || 3:00
|-  style="text-align:center; background:#cfc;"
| 2017-08-06 || Win ||align=left| Petek Sor.Saknarin || Rajadamnern Stadium || Bangkok, Thailand || Decision || 5 || 3:00
|-  style="text-align:center; background:#FFBBBB;"
| 2017-06-17 || Loss ||align=left| Tatsuya Noto || KNOCK OUT vol.3 || Tokyo, Japan || TKO (Punches) || 1 || 1:53
|-  style="text-align:center; background:#FFBBBB;"
| 2017-05-05 || Loss ||align=left| Senson Erawan || True4U, Rangsit Stadium || Rangsit, Thailand || Decision || 5 || 3:00
|-
! style=background:white colspan=9 |
|-  style="text-align:center; background:#cfc;"
| 2017-04-01 || Win ||align=left| Naoya Yajima || KNOCK OUT vol.2 || Tokyo, Japan || Decision (Majority) || 5 || 3:00
|-  style="text-align:center; background:#cfc;"
| 2017-02-17 || Win ||align=left| Senson Erawan || True4U, Rangsit Stadium || Rangsit, Thailand || Decision || 5 || 3:00
|-
! style=background:white colspan=9 |
|-  style="text-align:center; background:#cfc;"
| 2017-01-17 || Win ||align=left| Chaimongkon Suknoigym || Muaymanwasuk, Rangsit Stadium || Rangsit, Thailand || KO (Right elbow) || 3 ||
|-  style="text-align:center; background:#cfc;"
| 2016-12-28 || Win ||align=left| Panlangun Or Wittachai || Suk Yodo Muay Thai Hilux Vigo || Saraburi Province, Thailand || TKO (Low kicks) || 5 || 3:00
|-  style="text-align:center; background:#cfc;"
| 2016-11-16 || Win ||align=left| Supernew Sor-Jor-Benspatchinburi || Suk Yodo Muay Thai Hilux Revo / True4u || Ayutthaya Province, Thailand || TKO (Low kicks) || 2 ||
|-  style="text-align:center; background:#cfc;"
| 2016-09-30 || Win ||align=left| Ningnoi Sikrufaew || Rangsit Stadium / True4u || Rangsit, Thailand || TKO (Punches) || 2 ||
|-  style="text-align:center; background:#cfc;"
| 2016-07-30 || Win ||align=left| Petnamnen Sitjomyut || Siam Omnoi Boxing Stadium || Samut Sakhon, Thailand || TKO  || 4 ||
|-  style="text-align:center; background:#cfc;"
| 2016-06-19 || Win ||align=left| Tapnar Sor.Waritar || Wanchai+Kingthong Rajadamnern Stadium || Bangkok, Thailand || KO  || 3 || 2:37
|-  style="text-align:center; background:#cfc;"
| 2016-05-08 || Win ||align=left| Petek Sor.Saknarin || Rajadamnern Stadium || Bangkok, Thailand || Decision || 5 || 3:00
|-  style="text-align:center; background:#FFBBBB;"
| 2016-04-13 || Loss ||align=left| Neonar Sisonram || Rajadamnern Stadium || Bangkok, Thailand || Decision || 5 || 3:00
|-  style="text-align:center; background:#cfc;"
| 2016-03-21 || Win ||align=left| Petek Sor.Saknarin || Suk Yodo Muay Thai Hilux Vigo || Saraburi Province, Thailand || Decision || 5 || 3:00
|-  style="text-align:center; background:#FFBBBB;"
| 2015-12-17 || Loss ||align=left| Weeraponlek Kiatkonpon || Rajadamnern Stadium || Bangkok, Thailand || Decision || 5 || 3:00
|-  style="text-align:center; background:#FFBBBB;"
| 2015-10-29 || Loss ||align=left| Pepsi Kiatbanbai || Rajadamnern Stadium || Bangkok, Thailand || Decision || 5 || 3:00
|-  style="text-align:center; background:#cfc;"
| 2015-09-17 || Win ||align=left| Panpon Sor.Warisattar || Rajadamnern Stadium || Bangkok, Thailand || Decision || 5 || 3:00
|-  style="text-align:center; background:#FFBBBB;"
| 2015-08-03 || Loss ||align=left| Panpon Sor.Warisattar || Rajadamnern Stadium || Bangkok, Thailand || Decision || 5 || 3:00
|-  style="text-align:center; background:#cfc;"
| 2015-06-06 || Win ||align=left| Ekdecha Simnam || Lumpinee Stadium || Bangkok, Thailand || Decision || 5 || 3:00
|-  style="text-align:center; background:#c5d2ea;"
| 2015-05-10 || Draw ||align=left| Kazuki Osaki || Wanchai + PK MuayThai Super Fight || Nagoya, Japan || Decision || 3|| 3:00
|-  style="text-align:center; background:#FFBBBB;"
| 2015-02-23 || Loss ||align=left| Petnakon Sor.Siripun || Rajadamnern Stadium || Bangkok, Thailand || Decision || 5 || 3:00
|-  style="text-align:center; background:#c5d2ea;"
| 2014-12-27 || Draw ||align=left| Kazuki Osaki || Hoost Cup FOREVER|| Nagoya, Japan || Decision || 3 || 3:00
|-  style="text-align:center; background:#FFBBBB;"
| 2014-08-23 || Loss ||align=left| Newsemsan Nondengym || Rajadamnern Stadium || Bangkok, Thailand || Decision || 5 || 3:00
|-  style="text-align:center; background:#cfc;"
| 2014-07-31 || Win ||align=left| Parandet Sor.Petpubmee || Rajadamnern Stadium || Bangkok, Thailand || Decision || 5 || 3:00
|-  style="text-align:center; background:#cfc;"
| 2014-07-04 || Win ||align=left| Bualuang Sitjakong || Lumpinee Stadium || Bangkok, Thailand || Decision || 5 || 3:00
|-  style="text-align:center; background:#cfc;"
| 2014-05-05 || Win ||align=left| Makamlek Lukmakamwhan || Rajadamnern Stadium || Bangkok, Thailand || Decision || 5 || 3:00
|-  style="text-align:center; background:#cfc;"
| 2014-03-21 || Win ||align=left| Kaichon Kaikanpon || TRIBELATE vol.42 × Pumpanmuang || Tokyo, Japan || TKO || 3 || 1:39
|-
! style=background:white colspan=9 |
|-  style="text-align:center; background:#cfc;"
| 2013-09-02 || Win ||align=left| Phetpotong Lukmoo4 || Rajadamnern Stadium || Bangkok, Thailand || Decision || 5 || 3:00
|-  style="text-align:center; background:#cfc;"
| 2013-08-04 || Win ||align=left| Phetpotong Lukmoo4 || Rajadamnern Stadium || Bangkok, Thailand || Decision || 5 || 3:00
|-
| colspan=9 | Legend:    

|-  style="background:#cfc;"
| 2013-03-30 || Win ||align=left| Kaewplasuk Or.Bor.Tor Koskorn || MUAY THAI WINDY SUPER FIGHT Thailand expedition / Japan vs Thai junior match || Trang Province, Thailand || TKO (Left straight) || ||
|-
! style=background:white colspan=9 |
|-  style="background:#cfc;"
| 2013-03-16 || Win ||align=left| Kasem Klamlam || Special Installation Cadet Class fight || Bangkok, Thailand || Decision || 3 || 1:30
|-  style="background:#cfc;"
| 2013-02-24 || Win ||align=left| Kim Chung Song || GLADIATOR 51 || Fukuoka, Japan || TKO || 1 || 1:30
|-
! style=background:white colspan=9 |
|-  style="background:#cfc;"
| 2012-12-24 || Win ||align=left|  || Japan Amateur Muaythai 2013 WMF World Championships Qualifying Competition || Tokyo, Japan || ||  ||
|-  style="background:#FFBBBB;"
| 2012-08-26 || Loss ||align=left| Kaipet Suwan-Aharn-Peekmai || JKMO - Japan Kick Muay Thai event || Tokyo, Japan || Extra Round Decision ||  || 
|-
! style=background:white colspan=9 |
|-  style="background:#FFBBBB;"
| 2012-08-12 || Loss ||align=left| Kaipet Suwan-Aharn-Peekmai || Windy Kick Japan vs Thailand || Saraburi Province, Thailand || Decision ||  ||
|-  style="background:#cfc;"
| 2012-07-22|| Win ||align=left| Reiji Hazuma || GLADIATOR 39 || Fukuoka Prefecture, Japan || Decision || 3 || 3:00
|-  style="background:#cfc;"
| 2012-07-01|| Win ||align=left| Takuma Oota || Muay Thai WINDY Super Fight in NAGOYA～MuayThaiphoon!～ || Nagoya, Japan || KO (Front Kick)|| 1 ||
|-  style="background:#cfc;"
| 2012-06-10 || Win ||align=left| Kosuke Yamada || Muay Thai WINDY Super Fight vol.12 || Saraburi Province, Thailand || Decision || 5 || 1:30 
|-
! style=background:white colspan=9 |
|-  style="background:#FFBBBB;"
| 2012-04-07 || Loss ||align=left| Samingdam Sor.Kittibam || || Trang Province, Thailand || Decision || 5 ||
|-  style="background:#cfc;"
| 2012-03-12 || Win ||align=left|  || Muay Thai WINDY Super Fight  || Tokyo, Japan || Decision || ||  
|-
! style=background:white colspan=9 |
|-  style="background:#c5d2ea;"
| 2012-02-26 || Draw ||align=left| Chopperbank Rachanon ||  || Pattaya, Thailand || Decision || 5 ||
|-  style="background:#FFBBBB;"
| 2011-12-18 || Loss||align=left| Apichit || Muay Thai WINDY Super Fight vol.10 2011 FINAL || Tokyo, Japan || Decision (Split) || 5|| 1:30 
|-
! style=background:white colspan=9 |
|-  style="background:#cfc;"
| 2011-11-19 || Win||align=left| Chikara Iwao|| TRIBELATE vol.35 -Title Match Festival- || Tokyo, Japan || Ext.R Decision (Split) || 3|| 2:00
|-  style="background:#cfc;"
| 2011-10-10 || Win||align=left| Hikaru Fujimoto|| KING OF STRIKERS Round 6 || Fukuoka Prefecture, Japan || Ext.R Decision  || 3|| 2:00 
|-
! style=background:white colspan=9 |
|-  style="background:#cfc;"
| 2011-09-23 || Win ||align=left| Daigo Sunaga || Muay Thai WINDY Super Fight vol.9 || Nagoya, Japan || Decision (Unanimous) || 5|| 1:30
|-  style="background:#cfc;"
| 2011-07-31 || Win ||align=left| Kunito Tsuchiya|| Muay Thai WINDY Super Fight vol.8 || Tokyo, Japan || Decision  || 2||  
|-
! style=background:white colspan=9 |

|-  style="background:#cfc;"
| 2011-07-16 || Win ||align=left| Chikara Iwao|| TRIBELATE vol.33 || Tokyo, Japan || Decision  || 3||2:00  
|-
! style=background:white colspan=9 |

|-  style="background:#cfc;"
| 2011-07-03 || Win ||align=left| Kouki Yamada || Muay Thai WINDY Super Fight in NAGOYA ～Muay Tyhoon!～ || Nagoya, Japan || Decision (Unanimous) || 2|| 2:00
|-  style="background:#cfc;"
| 2011-06-19 || Win ||align=left| Shota Kuroki || M-1 FAIRTEX SINGHA BEERMuay Thai Challenge || Tokyo, Japan || Decision || 2|| 3:00 
|-
! style=background:white colspan=9 |
|-  style="background:#cfc;"
| 2011-04-10 || Win ||align=left| Yuki Kono || KING OF STRIKERS Round 4 || Fukuoka Prefecture, Japan || KO || 3||
|-  style="background:#cfc;"
| 2011-01-10 || Win ||align=left| Rikuto Tsuyama|| M-1 Muay Thai Amateur Kyushu || Fukuoka Prefecture, Japan || KO || 2||
|-  style="background:#fbb;"
| 2010-11-07 || Loss||align=left| Chikara Iwao|| Muay Thai WINDY Super Fight vol.5 2010 FINAL || Tokyo, Japan || Decision (Majority) || 2||  
|-
! style=background:white colspan=9 |
|-  style="background:#fbb;"
| 2010-09-19|| Loss || align=left| Shota Kuroki || Muay Thai WINDY Super Fight vol.4 || Tokyo, Japan || Decision ||  ||
|-  style="background:#cfc;"
| 2010-06-14 || Win||align=left| || Muay Thai WINDY Super Fight Vol.3 || Tokyo, Japan || Decision  || ||  
|-
! style=background:white colspan=9 |
|-  style="background:#fbb;"
| 2010-03-04 || Loss||align=left| Takahito Yamada|| Muay Thai WINDY Super Fight Vol.2 || Tokyo, Japan || Decision  || ||  
|-
! style=background:white colspan=9 |
|-  style="background:#cfc;"
| 2010-02-13 || Win||align=left| Denwanchai Wor.Wanchai || Muay Thai WINDY Super Fight in Kyushu || Kyushu, Japan || KO (Right Cross)|| 3 || 
|-
| colspan=9 | Legend:

See also
 List of male kickboxers

References

1998 births
Living people
Japanese male kickboxers
Sportspeople from Fukuoka Prefecture
Japanese Muay Thai practitioners